The women's 200m T54 event at the 2008 Summer Paralympics took place at the Beijing National Stadium on 14 September. There were three heats; the first 2 in each heat (Q) plus the 2 fastest other times (q) qualified.

Results

Heats
Competed from 12:00.

Heat 1

Heat 2

Heat 3

Final
Competed at 17:25.

Q = qualified for final by place. q = qualified by time. WR = World Record. DQ = Disqualified.

References
 
 

W
2008 in women's athletics